The East Dorset by-election was a Parliamentary by-election held on 30 June 1910. The constituency returned one Member of Parliament (MP) to the House of Commons of the United Kingdom, elected by the first past the post voting system.

Vacancy
Thirty-five-year-old Frederick Guest had been Liberal MP for the seat of East Dorset since the January 1910 general election. In May 1910, his own election result was declared void, and he was unseated because of election irregularities by his constituency agent. This meant a by-election would take place and without Guest as a candidate.

Electoral history
The seat had been Liberal since they gained it in the 1904 East Dorset by-election. They narrowly held the seat at the last election, with a slightly increased majority;

Candidates
The local Liberal Association selected 36-year-old Henry Guest, the older brother of Frederick Guest, to defend the seat. Like his brother, he had a military background, but unlike his brother, he had not before stood for parliament.
The Conservatives retained John Sanctuary Nicholson as their candidate.

Campaign
Polling Day was fixed for 30 June 1910.

Result
In a remarkably high turnout, almost as high as the last General Election, the Liberals held the seat and managed a slightly increased majority;

Aftermath
Henry Guest did not defend the seat at the December 1910 general election and was instead elected for Pembroke and Haverfordwest. This allowed Frederick Guest to return first as Liberal candidate and then as the MP again;

References

1910 in England
1910 elections in the United Kingdom
By-elections to the Parliament of the United Kingdom in Dorset constituencies
20th century in Dorset